Abdessalem Hallaoui (born 28 March 1989) is a Tunisian footballer who plays as a goalkeeper.

References

External links
 
 

1989 births
Living people
Tunisian footballers
Tunisian expatriate footballers
ES Métlaoui players
Ohod Club players
Tunisian Ligue Professionnelle 1 players
Saudi First Division League players
Expatriate footballers in Saudi Arabia
Tunisian expatriate sportspeople in Saudi Arabia
Association football goalkeepers